Cloverbrook was an American Thoroughbred racehorse that won the 1877 Preakness Stakes and Belmont Stakes, races that would become the second and third legs of the U.S. Triple Crown series.

Cloverbrook was the first horse to win the Preakness Stakes that had been bred and trained in Maryland. He was bred and raced by Edwin Augustus Clabaugh of Carroll County, Maryland and trained by Jeter Walden, a brother to Hall of Fame trainer R. Wyndham Walden.

Pedigree

References

1874 racehorse births
Racehorses bred in Maryland
Racehorses trained in the United States
Preakness Stakes winners
Belmont Stakes winners
Byerley Turk sire line
Thoroughbred family 15-d